Leuphana may refer to:

 Leuphana, the Greek name for an ancient settlement, possibly the site of the modern German city of Lüneburg
 Lüneburg, the modern city possibly built on the site of ancient Leuphana
 Leuphana University Lüneburg, a university in the city of Lüneburg